East Harnham Meadows is a 17.29 hectare biological Site of Special Scientific Interest in Wiltshire, England, in the Harnham suburb to the south-east of the city of Salisbury. The water-meadows are in the flood-plain of the River Avon.

The site was notified in 1995 for its herb-rich grassland.

References

External links
 Designated Site Summary – Natural England

Sites of Special Scientific Interest in Wiltshire
Sites of Special Scientific Interest notified in 1995
Geography of Salisbury
Meadows in Wiltshire